Renzo López Patrón (born 16 April 1994) is a Uruguayan professional footballer who plays as a forward for Al-Batin in the Saudi Professional League.

Career
After playing several seasons in Uruguay, Renzo López signed on loan for Extremadura UD. His stint to Spain didn't last more than one year, but he managed to sign in December 2017 for another loan outside South America, this time to Japan and to Kyoto Sanga.

In March 2021, he signed a one-year loan deal with Montevideo Wanderers, a division rival to the club he was loaned from, Plaza Colonia.

On 7 January 2023, López joined Saudi Arabian club Al-Batin.

References

External links
Profile at Kyoto Sanga

1994 births
Living people
Uruguayan footballers
Uruguayan expatriate footballers
Uruguayan Primera División players
Association football forwards
Segunda División B players
J1 League players
J2 League players
Chilean Primera División players
Argentine Primera División players
Saudi Professional League players
C.A. Rentistas players
Racing Club de Montevideo players
Sud América players
Extremadura UD footballers
Club Plaza Colonia de Deportes players
Kyoto Sanga FC players
O'Higgins F.C. footballers
Sagan Tosu players
Montevideo Wanderers F.C. players
Al Batin FC players
Uruguayan expatriate sportspeople in Spain
Uruguayan expatriate sportspeople in Japan
Uruguayan expatriate sportspeople in Chile
Uruguayan expatriate sportspeople in Argentina
Uruguayan expatriate sportspeople in Saudi Arabia
Expatriate footballers in Spain
Expatriate footballers in Japan
Expatriate footballers in Chile
Expatriate footballers in Argentina
Expatriate footballers in Saudi Arabia